Princess Kaiulani (sometimes titled Barbarian Princess) is a 2009 British-American biographical drama film based on the life of Princess Kaiulani (1875–1899) of the Kingdom of Hawaiʻi.

Plot
At Iolani Palace, Princess Kaiulani and the rest of the royal family prepare for a ceremony that night to light Honolulu with only electricity. That evening, however, the ceremony is interrupted when a large group of armed white men enter the palace grounds. Led by Lorrin Thurston, the men demand that Ka'iulani's uncle, King Kalakaua, sign a new constitution to restrict the power of the monarchy as well as to grant huge governmental powers to citizens of European ancestry. The situation soon devolves into a tense standoff between Thurston's men and the Royal Guards. Amidst the chaos of the moment Ka'iulani is taken away for her own safety by her Scottish father, Archie Cleghorn, and sent to England for both protection and education.

Now in England, Ka'iulani struggles to fit in as her Polynesian heritage makes her a target of racism and offensive stereotypes from the Europeans whom she meets. She does make some friends, including the handsome young Clive Davies. They develop a relationship and the two become engaged. But one day her father returns from Hawaii after several years and, to her shock, informs her that her uncle, King Kalakaua, had died shortly after being forced to sign the new constitution by Thurston and Sanford B. Dole. He then informs her that a failed native rebellion against the new constitution gave Thurston a reason to arrest and depose Queen Liliuokalani, overthrowing the monarchy and declaring Hawai'i a republic. After discovering that the Davies family knew of her family's overthrow but hid the news from her Ka'iulani decides to call off her engagement and leave England. She travels to the United States where she gathers media attention and denounces the overthrow as well as the U.S.'s involvement. Her cultured, regal appearance overcomes the racist views against her, and many note that she is not the "Barbarian Princess" she was depicted as at all. Her campaign against the overthrow climaxes with her meeting U.S. President Grover Cleveland. At a lunch with the President, Ka'iulani charms him and convinces him to actively oppose the overthrow, which he does by refusing to annex Hawaii as an American territory. Unfortunately for Ka'iulani, this act is done during the waning days of the Cleveland administration, and a few weeks later President William McKinley is inaugurated.

When Ka'iulani returns to Hawaii, she learns the new president has not only failed to oppose the overthrow but has also accepted Thurston's annexation proposal, annexing Hawaii as a territory of the United States. She attends a small private funeral for the Kingdom of Hawaiʻi, hosted by her aunt, Queen Liliuokalani. Shortly after her return, she is visited by Sanford B. Dole, who explains that three U.S. legal commissioners are arriving, and that he and Thurston would like the Princess to host a small dinner for them. Though she is appalled at the impertinent request, he convinces her that it might be to her advantage too. At the dinner, Ka'iulani charms her visitors before surprising Thurston by publicly petitioning for an amendment to the annexation treaty to guarantee universal suffrage and voting rights to all Native Hawaiians. She is disregarded by an appalled Thurston, who points out she is not a recognized diplomat before Dole stands up for the princess and declares he will petition the amendment for her. As the amendment gathers support amongst the dinner guests, Thurston leaves, embarrassed and furious.

After the dinner, Ka'iulani is surprised to learn that her former fiancee Clive has come to Hawaii, as he had promised he would, and she goes to see him. He tells her that his father has died and he is now in charge of his assets, including those in Hawaii. The two make up, and Clive asks Ka'iulani to return to England and marry him. She refuses, stating that her future is in Hawaii. When he equally refuses to move to Hawaii, the two share a last farewell kiss before Clive leaves for England. The film ends with Ka'iulani returning her treasured seashells, which she had kept throughout her travels to remind her of Hawaii, back to the ocean as she wades in the waves, with a voiceover saying that the bright flame of Ka'iulani is kept alive by the love of her people. A post-credits card shows that Ka'iulani died less than one year after the annexation, some say of a broken heart for the loss of her kingdom. Another card mentions that in 1993 President Clinton signed the Apology Resolution, apologizing to Hawaii for the role the United States government played in the overthrow.

Cast 
 Q'orianka Kilcher as Princess Kaʻiulani
 Barry Pepper as Lorrin A. Thurston
 Shaun Evans as Clive Davies
 Will Patton as Sanford B. Dole
 Ned Van Zandt as Senator Collum
 Jimmy Yuill as Archibald Scott Cleghorn
 Leo Anderson Akana as Queen Liliuokalani
 Ocean Ka'owili as King Kalākaua
 Reupena Paopao Sheck as Prince David Kawānanakoa "Koa"
 Kimo Kalilikane as Kalehua
 Kamuela Kalilikane as Mamane
 Peter Banks as President Grover Cleveland
 Rosamund Stephen as Mrs. Cleveland
 Julian Glover as Theophilus Harris Davies
 Barbara Wilshere as Mrs. Mary Ellen Davies
 Tamzin Merchant as Alice Davies
 Catherine Steadman as Miss Barnes
 Kainoa Kilcher as Kaleo
 Laura Soller as Mrs. Anna Dole
 Christian Brassington as Duke of Winchester
 Olivia Mardon as Duchess of Winchester
 Jay Lembeck as Premier Walter M. Gibson
 Ka'alaka'iopono Faurot as Keiki (Baby) Kaʻiulani

Controversy 
The film's working title Barbarian Princess provoked controversy in Hawaii, with individuals stating that it brings up painful memories of past discrimination, whereas others thought that would be a title for a fantasy gothic film akin to Conan the Barbarian (1982).  In response, the title was briefly changed to The Last Princess, changed to Princess Kaiulani later in 2008, then shown as Barbarian Princess for the 2009 festival.  The producers stated that the title was meant to be ironic and is meant to draw audiences who may not be familiar with the history of Hawaii. The film was finally released for wider distribution as Princess Kaiulani.

Many native Hawaiians were disappointed that the film used a non-Hawaiian for the title role.

Critical reception
, the film holds a 18% approval rating on Rotten Tomatoes, based on 38 reviews with an average rating of 4.53/10. The website's critics consensus reads: "A middling biopic about an important figure in Hawaiian history, Princes Kaiulani looks and feels like a TV movie of the week and offers about as much insight." Roger Ebert called it an "interesting but creaky biopic."
Hailed by the Hollywood Reporter and panned by the New York press, Princess Kaiulani was either praised or left audiences cold.
The film won the Audience Award for "Best Feature" at the 2009 Honolulu International Film Festival in a tie with Precious: Based on the Novel "Push" by Sapphire.

References

External links 
 
 

 https://www.youtube.com/watch?v=gubVK_Si-Y4#t=334 Comments by Palani Vaughan

2009 films
2009 biographical drama films
2000s historical drama films
British biographical drama films
British historical drama films
American biographical drama films
American historical drama films
Films set in the 1890s
Films set in the 1880s
Films set in Hawaii
Films set in England
Films set in Washington, D.C.
Films shot in Honolulu
Films shot in Norfolk
Films shot in England
Films about interracial romance
Biographical films about royalty
Films about princesses
Hawaiian-language films
2000s English-language films
Roadside Attractions films
Cultural depictions of Grover Cleveland
Films scored by Stephen Warbeck
2009 drama films
2000s American films
2000s British films